Claudia Alvera (born 6 July 1966) is an Italian curler.

Personal life
Alvera works as a chef. She is married and has two daughters who curled with her – Giorgia and Federica Apollonio. Her brother is an Italian curler and coach Fabio Alverà.

References

External links

1969 births
Living people
Italian female curlers
People from Cortina d'Ampezzo
Sportspeople from the Province of Belluno